The Amateur Astronomers Association of Pittsburgh (AAAP) is an Astronomical Organization founded on June 9, 1929, by Chester B. Roe and Leo J. Scanlon.  Since then, it has grown to over 500 members and operates two observatories in the Pittsburgh region: the Nicholas E. Wagman Observatory and the Mingo Creek Park Observatory.  The club also sponsors many star parties which also is open to members of the public throughout the year.

The club's motto is "We have loved the stars too fondly to be fearful of the night," from the Sarah Williams poem "The Old Astronomer to his Pupil".

The Amateur Astronomers Association of Pittsburgh, Inc. (AAAP) has promoted popular astronomy in western Pennsylvania for 75 years. With over 500 members, it is one of the larger astronomy clubs in the nation. At monthly meetings, upcoming celestial events such as meteor showers, comets, occultations, and planetary alignments are announced. Observations and techniques are shared so that all members may benefit from the experiences. Each meeting also features a special speaker, sometimes an AAAP member, as well as outside experts from various fields. Past speakers have presented topics including meteorite hunting in Antarctica, cosmological modeling using supercomputers, and astrophotography with exotic equipment such as dry-ice cameras.

Facilities

Nicholas E. Wagman Observatory
The Nicholas E. Wagman Observatory houses two permanent telescopes including the Brashear 11-inch refractor.

At 1340 feet elevation, it is one of the highest points in Allegheny County, and one of the few such sites not already occupied by a radio mast, microwave relay tower, or water tank. It is believed that local Indian tribes in the area, such as the Seneca, once used the hill as a lookout for watching game and the activities of neighboring tribes. The hill affords an almost 100% view of the sky. Because of its location in a relatively rural country park, the observatory is protected from the majority of commercial or residential development that could cause excessive light pollution. The site can be reached from downtown Pittsburgh in 45 minutes, and even from the southern reaches of the county in less than an hour, thanks to the proximity of the Route 28 expressway, and the Pennsylvania Turnpike.

The Observatory is owned and operated by the AAAP. Originally built in 1987 and expanded in 1995, it is the first and only amateur astronomical observatory in western Pennsylvania dedicated to public education and enjoyment of the science of astronomy. The facility is used for scheduled public viewing evenings (Star Parties), as well as the recreational and scientific observations of the membership. During Star Parties visitors may view celestial objects through the observatory's two large permanent telescopes: the Brashear 11-inch Refractor and the Manka Memorial Telescope, a 21-inch Newtonian Reflector, or any of a wide variety of portable telescopes set up on the spacious grounds by members. The observatory has been used by scout groups, science classes from local schools, and civic groups.

Mingo Creek Park Observatory
The Mingo Creek Park Observatory was dedicated on August 27, 2005.

The Mingo Creek Park Observatory is owned and operated by the AAAP. The Observatory was built in the spring/summer of 2004, and officially dedicated in August 2005.  It has become the largest amateur astronomical observatory in Southwestern Pennsylvania dedicated to public education and enjoyment of the science of astronomy.  The mission of the Mingo Creek Park Observatory is to educate and make freely available to a diverse public of all ages programs on astronomy and the preservation of dark skies.  The facility is used for scheduled public viewing evenings (Star Parties), as well as the recreational and scientific observations of the membership.  During Star Parties visitors are able to view celestial objects through the observatory's two large permanent telescopes, a 24-inch RC Reflector and the D&G 10-inch Refractor, or any of a wide variety of portable telescopes set up on the  grounds by members. The observatory has been a destination and center of astronomical activities for scout groups, science classes from local schools, and civic groups.

The AAAP has acquired a planetarium projector and dome that has become a popular educational tool for the new Observatory.  People attending a star party can see a short basic planetarium program on the night sky, and then step directly outside and look up (or through a telescope) and see what was just shown to them inside!  This is especially useful on cloudy nights, along with the classroom astronomy displays, AV presentations, and computer projected lectures.

Greene County Site
Despite Wagman observatory being in just about the remotest part of Allegheny County, the sky glow from encroaching civilization is plainly visible. For those AAAP members who want to experience the night sky in a low light pollution setting, there is the Greene County Site. This observatory is a cow pasture, whose owner has given the AAAP explicit permission to use as a site for setting up portable telescopes and equipment.

See also
 List of astronomical societies

References

External links
 AAAP Homepage
 Mingo Creek Park Observatory dedication, August 27, 2005
 A satellite image of Mingo Creek Park Observatory

Organizations based in Pittsburgh
Amateur astronomy organizations
Organizations established in 1929
1929 establishments in Pennsylvania